InCar is a 2023 Indian Hindi-language road crime film written and directed by Harsh Warrdhan,  starring Ritika Singh, Manish Jhanjholia and Richie Sandeep Goyat. Inspired by true events, the film is simultaneously dubbed into Telugu, Tamil, Kannada, and Malayalam. Upon release InCar received positive reviews.

Plot

The films deals with three remorseless kidnappers sprung out of prison, Richie, his elder brother Yash and their uncle who hijack a car and its driver on a busy Delhi highway. The trio kidnap a college student Sakshi waiting near a bus station. The group threatens, blackmails, molests and gang-rapes Sakshi in the moving car and take her to a remote hide-out where they attempt to kill her. Sakshi retaliates the aggravated assault on her, attacks and kills the trio with the help of the driver and escapes the scene. The film depicts the lack of road safety to women in India.

Cast
Ritika Singh as Sakshi Gulati
Manish Jhanjholia as Richie
Richie Sandeep Goyat as Yash
Sunil Soni as Mama
Gyan Prakash as Car owner / Driver
Samsher Singh Sam as Guy at petrol pump

Critical reception 
Punjab Kesari gave 3.5 out of 5 ratings, ABP News gave 1.5 out of 5 ratings and Grace Cyril of India Today gave 3 out of 5 ratings.

Nandini Ramnath of Scroll.in wrote it as "An exploitative nightmare on wheels".

The film has been also reviewed by Urmila Kori of Prabhat Khabar and Manoj Vashisth of Dainik Jagran.

References

External links

2020s Hindi-language films
Indian road movies
Films set in Delhi
Films shot in Delhi
Indian thriller films
Indian avant-garde and experimental films
Indian survival films
2020s road movies
2023 films
Films about social issues
Films about kidnapping
Films about kidnapping in India
Films about rape in India
Indian independent films
Films about women in India
Indian drama road movies
Films about social issues in India
Indian neo-noir films
Indian crime films
2020 thriller films
Hindi-language thriller films